Shane Tutmarc (born September 25, 1981) is an American producer, songwriter, singer and multi-instrumentalist.

Career
Tutmarc is the great-grandson of Paul Tutmarc, who has been credited as the inventor of the electric bass. His grandfather, Bud Tutmarc, was a well-known Hawaiian steel guitar player.

Tutmarc was the leader of Seattle band Dolour from 1997 to 2007. He has played in several other bands, including United State of Electronica and Shane Tutmarc & The Traveling Mercies. In June 2009, Tutmarc released his first solo album, Shouting at a Silent Sky. In January 2010, he re-located to Nashville, Tennessee. Several of his songs have been featured on television programs and films.  In 2016, Tutmarc began a new project called Solar Twin.

Tutmarc has produced and played instruments on other artists' albums, including Ian McGlynn's "Tomorrow's Taken" (2004), Sameer Shukla's "There's Only One Side Tonight" (2005), Patrick Kinsley's "Rattling the Cage" (2014), Tanya Montana Coe's "Silver Bullet" (2015) and "Hide Your Emotion" (2019), and both of The Explorers Club's 2020 full-length releases.

Discography

Dolour
 "The Shivering / That Dreadful Anthem (Single)" 7-inch (1998)
 "Waiting for a World War" (2001)
 "Iceland / The Ballad (Single)" 7-inch (2001)
 "Suburbiac" (2002)
 "CPR (EP)" (2003)
 "New Old Friends" (2004)
 "A Matter of Time: 2000-2005 (Compilation)" (2005)
 "The Years in the Wilderness (Album)" (2007)
 "The Royal We (Album)" (2020)
 "Televangelist (Album)" (2021)
 "Origin Story (Album)" (2021)

Shane Tutmarc & The Traveling Mercies 
 "I'm Gonna Live the Life I Sing About In My Song" (2007)
 "Hey Lazarus!" (2008)
 "Live On Air" (2019) - Bandcamp exclusive collection of radio performances

Solo 
 "Shouting At A Silent Sky (Album)" (2009)
 "Ride (Single)" (2013) Lana Del Rey cover
 "Portions for Foxes (Single)" (2013) Rilo Kiley cover
 "Aneurysm (Single)" (2013) Nirvana cover
 "Borrowed Trouble (Album)" (2014)
 "Busy Being Born Again (Compilation)" (2018) collection of home recorded covers from 2007-2009
 "Seattle Is Dying (Single)" (2019) - featured in the KOMO News documentary, Seattle is Dying
 "Dark Circles: The Shouting at a Silent Sky Demos (Compilation)" (2019) - BandCamp exclusive 
 "A Brave New World (Single)" (2020) 
 "Written & Produced by Shane Tutmarc (Compilation)" (2020) - featuring solo songs, plus Dolour and Solar Twin.

Solar Twin
 "Slow Motion (Single)" (2016)
 "Black Sky Revisited (Single)" (2016)
 "The Big Sleep (Single)" (2017)
 "Pink Noise (Album)" (2017)
 "I Would Die 4 U (Single)" (2018) Record Store Day cover of Prince song.
 "Hold On To This Moment (Single)" (2018)

Collaborations and contributions

References

External links

 
Tutmarc's Bandcamp

Musicians from Washington (state)
1981 births
Living people